"I Want to Know What Love Is" is a power ballad by the British-American rock band Foreigner. It was released in November 1984 as the lead single from their fifth album, Agent Provocateur. The song hit number one in both the United Kingdom and the United States and is the group's biggest hit to date. It remains one of the band's best-known songs and most enduring radio hits, charting in the top 25 in 2000, 2001, and 2002 on the Billboard Hot Adult Contemporary Recurrents chart. "I Want to Know What Love Is" has continued to garner critical acclaim, and is listed as one of Rolling Stone magazine's greatest songs of all time at number 476 in 2004 and at number 479 in 2010. The song is also featured in a number of films.

Song information

"I Want to Know What Love Is" was the first single released from Foreigner's album Agent Provocateur (1984).  It is credited to Mick Jones, although an uncredited portion (somewhere between 5% according to Jones and 35% according to Gramm) was contributed by Lou Gramm.  It was produced by Jones and Alex Sadkin. The song features backing vocals from the New Jersey Mass Choir affiliated with the Gospel Music Workshop of America, Dreamgirls star Jennifer Holliday, and featured keyboard work by Thompson Twins frontman Tom Bailey. The choir also appears in the song's music video.

According to Gramm, Jones was originally reluctant to let Gramm hear his initial rough version of the song. Gramm speculated that the song was emotional to Jones because it "represented things in his own life that he hadn't been able to resolve, and he wasn't too sure he wanted to have millions of people hear about it.

Cash Box reviewed the single, calling it "a highly dramatic and ultimately very touching song which amply displays Foreigner’s musical talents and versatility."  Cash Box specifically praised the band's performances, especially that of lead singer Gramm, who they said "delivers a moving and personal quality which captures the essence of the lyrics.  Billboard said that the "dramatic mood piece grows out of quiet introspection into a full-blown production number with choir."

"I Want to Know What Love Is" reached number one on the UK Singles Chart on January 15, 1985, displacing Band Aid's "Do They Know It's Christmas?", staying there for three weeks, and knocked Madonna's long-running "Like a Virgin" out of number one on the Billboard Hot 100 on February 2, 1985. It was Foreigner's first and only pop chart-topper in either country, although the band had four number one Mainstream Rock hits and a number one adult contemporary radio hit in the US. This was the band's third of four number one singles on the Mainstream Rock chart. The song spent five weeks at number one in Australia and also hit the top of the charts in Canada, Ireland, New Zealand, Norway and Sweden, while peaking at number two in Switzerland and South Africa.

The song has received positive retrospective reviews from critics, with Bret Adams of AllMusic writing: "It's not hard to see why it became Foreigner's first number one single. Its dreamy, hypnotic feel is due in part to Lou Gramm's soulful lead vocals and the New Jersey Mass Choir's background vocals."

The song was also issued as a 12-inch single with a longer running time of 6:23. This version contains a slightly longer intro and an extended vocal chorus/fadeout ending. The single's B-side, "Street Thunder (Marathon Theme)," is an instrumental track originally appearing on The Official Music of the XXIII Olympiad – Los Angeles 1984 and later on the band's 2-CD compilation Jukebox Heroes: The Foreigner Anthology (2000).

Soon after Foreigner's single topped the charts, the New Jersey Mass Choir released its own similar-sounding version of the song on an album also titled I Want to Know What Love Is. The choir's single peaked at number 37 on the then-Hot Black Singles chart and number 12 on the Hot Dance Music/Maxi-Singles Sales chart.

"I Want to Know What Love Is" was ranked as the number four Billboard Hot 100 single of 1985. It was the band's third platinum single in the US and their first and only gold single in the UK. It was certified platinum in the UK in 2020.

Jones has rated it as one of his 11 favorite Foreigner songs.

Originally consisting of three verses, a pre-chorus and a chorus, the song was extended with a bridge written by original songwriter Mick Jones specifically for Tina Arena's cover in 1998.

Personnel 
Foreigner
 Lou Gramm – lead vocals
 Mick Jones – keyboards, synthesizers, backing vocals
 Rick Wills – bass, backing vocals
 Dennis Elliott – drums

Guest Musicians
 Tom Bailey – synthesizers
 Don Harper – backing vocals
 Jennifer Holliday – backing vocals and arrangements
 New Jersey Mass Choir of the GMWA – backing vocals

Charts and certifications

Weekly charts

Year-end charts

All-time charts

Certifications

Tina Arena version

"I Want to Know What Love Is" was covered by Australian singer Tina Arena and her recording was released as a single in 1998 from her album In Deep. Arena's version of the song was produced by Foreigner band member Mick Jones, who wrote the song. This version of the song includes a previously unrecorded bridge between the second and third choruses, specifically written for Tina Arena by Mick Jones.

Track listings
European Maxi Single
 "I Want to Know What Love Is" (Single Edit)
 "I Want to Know What Love Is" (R & B Mix)
 "I Want to Spend My Lifetime Loving You" (G-Vo Extended Mix)
 "Not For Sale"

Australian CD1 Maxi Single
 "I Want To Know What Love Is" (Single Edit)
 "Now I Can Dance" (Spanglish Version)
 "Now I Can Dance" (Live)
 "If I Didn't Love You" (Remix)

Australian CD2 Maxi Single – The Remixes
 "I Want to Know What Love Is" (R'n'B Mix)
 "I Want to Know What Love Is" (Urban Mix)
 "I Want to Know What Love Is" (Extended Urban Mix)
 "I Want to Know What Love Is" (Single Edit)

Charts
The song peaked at number 13 in France and finished 60th on the end-of-year chart of 1999.

Certifications

Wynonna Judd version

"I Want to Know What Love Is" was covered by American country singer Wynonna Judd and her recording was released on August 24, 2004, from her album What the World Needs Now Is Love as fourth single. Wynonna's version of the song was produced by Narada Michael Walden, known for his work with Mariah Carey, Whitney Houston, Diana Ross, Aretha Franklin and George Michael, and Wynonna. This version of the song was included in a popular Brazilian soap opera, Senhora do Destino.

Personnel

 Tim Akers – keyboards
 Robert Bailey – background vocals
 Jeff Beck – electric guitar
 Bekka Bramlett – background vocals
 Mike Brignardello – bass guitar
 Tom Bukovac – electric guitar
 David Campbell – string arrangements, conductor
 Kim Fleming – background vocals
 Paul Franklin – steel guitar
 Reggie Hamilton – bass guitar
 Vicki Hampton – background vocals
 Dann Huff – electric guitar
 David Huff – loop programming
 Ronn Huff – string arrangements
 Wynonna Judd – lead vocals
 Suzie Katayama – string contractor
 Jerry McPherson – electric guitar
 Steve Nathan – keyboards
 Don Potter – acoustic guitar
 John "J.R." Robinson – drums
 Willie Weeks – bass guitar

Track listings
Digital download
 "I Want to Know What Love Is" – 5:41

Remixes
 "I Want to Know What Love Is" (Piper Remix) – 4:05
 "I Want to Know What Love Is" (Piper Club Mix) – 7:42

Charts
In the US, the song peaked at number 14 on the Billboard Adult Contemporary chart. On the Hot Dance Club Songs of Billboard, it debuted at number 50 and peaked at number 12. It is also her first single to chart in Sweden, where it debuted at number 67 and peaked at number 15.

Release history

Mariah Carey version

"I Want to Know What Love Is" was covered by American singer Mariah Carey and released as the second single from her twelfth studio album, Memoirs of an Imperfect Angel (2009). The single, produced by Carey, C. "Tricky" Stewart and James "Big Jim" Wright, was sent to European radio stations on August 28 and first impacted US radio on September 14, 2009. Mick Jones said of her version: "I think she's actually retained the integrity of the song. You know, the arrangement is very similar to the original. They haven't tampered with the song too much. She's captured a certain emotional thing, a feeling."

Critical reception
The single was generally well received by critics; Australian magazine Rhyme & Reason stated that "[While Carey stayed] [...] true to the original, this piano-led remake is less an overhaul of the classic '80s hit than it is a modest but impressive update." Bill Lamb from About.com said that "Mariah Carey's new version could leave you speechless. The diversity of vocal coloring expressed in this recording is stunning. While the single 'Obsessed' remains disappointing, this single is a reminder of just how formidable Carey's talents are given a strong production and arrangement".

Writing in a Los Angeles Times music blog, Todd Martens said, "[T]ackling a well-known power ballad seems like a safe choice. It's a comfortable fall-back plan after "Obsessed" performed well, but did far from blockbuster numbers. It will undoubtedly be a hit, but it's giving me more reason to fear Imperfect Angel."

Performances and promotion
 Carey debuted "I Want to Know What Love Is" at her Live at the Pearl concerts in the Pearl Arena at The Palms Casino & Resort, Las Vegas, on September 11 and 12, 2009.
 Carey performed the song live on The Oprah Winfrey Show on September 18.
 A New York radio station contest featured as its prize a mini concert by Carey at the P.C. Richard Theater in TriBeCa, New York on October 5, where she sang the song as well as "Obsessed" and "H.A.T.E.U.", also from the album.
 Carey performed the single on X Factor Italia in Italy on November 11, 2009.
Carey performed the single on The X Factor in the United Kingdom on November 22, 2009.
Carey performed the song on the Angels Advocate Tour, solely in Brazil, due to her version's massive success there.

Music video
Carey filmed a music video for "I Want to Know What Love Is" in September 2009 in New York City, directed by Hype Williams.
The video premiered on Mariah's official website on November 13, 2009.
The video features Carey singing in Yankee Stadium, intercut with shots of the audience, often accompanied by loved ones, and some glimpses into the tough times in their past, as they grow emotional from the song's performance. A gospel choir joins Carey at the center of the stadium at the video's end. Carey wears the signature curly hairstyle from the initial stages of her career circa 1990–1993, maintaining the Memoirs theme of the album.

Formats and track listings

 Digital download
 "I Want to Know What Love Is" (album version) – 3:27

 UK bundle
 "I Want to Know What Love Is" (album version) – 3:27
 "I Want to Know What Love Is" (Moto Blanco Club Edit) – 3:25
 "I Want to Know What Love Is" (Chew Fu Radio Fix) – 3:51

 European CD single
 "I Want to Know What Love Is" – 3:37
 "Obsessed" (Cahill Club Mix) – 6:23

 Digital maxi-single

 "I Want to Know What Love Is" (album version) – 3:27
 "I Want to Know What Love Is" (Moto Blanco Club Edit) – 3:25
 "I Want to Know What Love Is" (Chriss Ortega Club Edit) – 3:36
 "I Want to Know What Love Is" (Cutmore's Club Shakedown) – 6:44
 "I Want to Know What Love Is" (Donni Hotwheel Tempo Mix) – 3:05
 "I Want to Know What Love Is" (Low Sunday Tempo Mix) – 3:14
 "I Want to Know What Love Is" (Chew Fu Radio Fix) – 3:51
 "I Want to Know What Love Is" (Nu Addiction Club Edit) – 3:29

 I Want to Know What Love Is (The Remixes)

 "I Want to Know What Love Is" (Donni Hotwheel Tempo Mix) – 3:06
 "I Want to Know What Love Is" (Low Sunday Tempo Mix) – 3:16
 "I Want to Know What Love Is" (Moto Blanco Club Edit) – 3:25
 "I Want to Know What Love Is" (Cutmore's Radio Shakedown) – 3:13
 "I Want to Know What Love Is" (Chew Fu Radio Fix) – 3:52
 "I Want to Know What Love Is" (Chriss Ortega Club Edit) – 3:36
 "I Want to Know What Love Is" (Nu Addiction Club Edit) – 3:30
 "I Want to Know What Love Is" (Moto Blanco Club Mix) – 6:53
 "I Want to Know What Love Is" (Cutmore's Club Shakedown) – 6:45
 "I Want to Know What Love Is" (Chew Fu Club Fix) – 6:03
 "I Want to Know What Love Is" (Chriss Ortega Club Mix) – 6:05
 "I Want to Know What Love Is" (Nu Addiction Club Mix) – 6:54
 "I Want to Know What Love Is" (Moto Blanco Dub) – 6:23
 "I Want to Know What Love Is" (Nu Addiction Dub) – 8:43

Credits and personnel
Adapted from CD liner notes.
Recording locations
Recorded at The Boom Boom Room (Burbank, California), The Setai (Miami, Florida) and Honeywest Studios (New York City).
Additional background vocals and mixing at Soapbox Studios (Atlanta).

Personnel

Backing Vocals – Big Jim Wright, Mary Ann Tatum, Sherry McGhee, Sherry Tatum
Drums – Jerohn Garnett
Engineer [Additional] – Carlos Oyanedel, Damien Lewis
Keyboards – Matthew Rollings
Keyboards, Organ [Hammond B3] – Big Jim Wright, Tricky Stewart
Lead Vocals – Mariah Carey
Mixed By – Phil Tan

Producer – C. "Tricky" Stewart*, James "Big Jim" Wright, Mariah Carey
Producer [Additional], Bass – Randy Jackson
Programmed By [Keyboards] – John Lemkuhl
Recorded By – Brian Garten, Chris 'Tek' O'Ryan*, Kevin Guarnieri
Recorded By [Assistant Engineer] – Luis Navarro
Written-By – Mick Jones

Chart performance
The song peaked on the US Billboard Adult Contemporary chart at number 10 bringing Carey's total number of Top Ten hits on that chart to 20, one short of Celine Dion's record. She has since surpassed this and is now tied with Celine Dion after her single "Oh Santa!" reached number one in 2010. However, it only peaked at #60 on the US Hot 100. On the UK Singles Chart, the song debuted at number 19 on the week ending November 29, 2009, becoming her highest debuting and peaking song since 2008's "Touch My Body", which peaked at number five.

The song debuted at number six in France, selling 1,910 CDs in its first week.

In Brazil, the song was boosted for its inclusion in popular telenovela Viver a Vida and stayed at number one for 27 consecutive weeks on the airplay chart, becoming the longest running number one song ever.

Charts

Weekly charts

Monthly charts

Year-end charts

Release history

Other cover versions
Filipina singer Sarah Geronimo recorded her own version the song, released in 2005; this is based on Tina Arena's version with additional lyrics for the bridge.

See also
 List of Billboard Hot 100 number-one singles of 1985

References

1984 songs
1984 singles
1985 singles
1998 singles
2004 singles
2009 singles
Billboard Hot 100 number-one singles
Brasil Hot 100 Airplay number-one singles
Brasil Hot Pop number-one singles
Cashbox number-one singles
Foreigner (band) songs
Mariah Carey songs
Music videos directed by Hype Williams
Number-one singles in Australia
Number-one singles in Norway
Number-one singles in Sweden
1980s ballads
Rock ballads
RPM Top Singles number-one singles
Songs written by Mick Jones (Foreigner)
Tina Arena songs
UK Singles Chart number-one singles
Wynonna Judd songs
Atlantic Records singles
Columbia Records singles
Asylum Records singles
Curb Records singles
Song recordings produced by Narada Michael Walden
Island Records singles
Song recordings produced by Tricky Stewart
Number-one singles in New Zealand
Song recordings produced by Mariah Carey
Song recordings produced by Alex Sadkin
Song recordings produced by Mick Jones (Foreigner)